Pavel Henadzevich Bareisha (born 16 February 1991) is a Belarusian athlete whose specialty is the hammer throw. He competed at the 2015 World Championships in Beijing without qualifying for the final. In addition, he won the silver medal at the 2015 Summer Universiade. His personal best in the event is 77.03 metres set in Jablonec nad Nisou in 2015.

Competition record

References

External links

1991 births
Living people
Belarusian male hammer throwers
World Athletics Championships athletes for Belarus
Place of birth missing (living people)
Athletes (track and field) at the 2016 Summer Olympics
Olympic athletes of Belarus
Universiade silver medalists in athletics (track and field)
Universiade silver medalists for Belarus
Medalists at the 2015 Summer Universiade
Medalists at the 2017 Summer Universiade